The Scottville School, also known as the Old School House, is a school located at 209 North Main Street in Scottville, Michigan.  It was listed on the National Register of Historic Places in 1985.

History
The Scottville School was constructed in 1888, and served as Scottville's only school until the 1950s.  Additions were made to the school in 1893, 1903, 1911, and 1927.  It was used as the high school and middle school until 1976, when the Mason County Central Middle School was built.

After closing, the building was used by Faith Tech, a Christian training school.  Faith Tech moved out in 1979, and the building was vacant for years until being opened as a retail outlet in the 1990s.  That closed in 1996, and it sat vacant again until 2012, when it was purchased by John Wilton, who began refurbishing it.

Description
The Scottville School is a large brick structure, originally constructed in 1888 but with multiple later additions that altered its footprint.

The main brick building is a symmetrical cross-shaped structure with hipped roof projecting center and wings, and a pyramid-roofed central square tower. Three gabled dormers project from the front.  Both the central projection (1903) and the wings (1911) are additions to the original square plan of the building.  A flat-roofed gymnasium is attached to the rear of the building.

The facade has broad, round-topped doorways and tall, square, transomed windows. Interior passageways around the central foyer are arched, and a central double staircase rises in the center.

References

School buildings on the National Register of Historic Places in Michigan
Romanesque Revival architecture in Michigan
School buildings completed in 1888
Buildings and structures in Mason County, Michigan
National Register of Historic Places in Mason County, Michigan